The Wingfield Sculls is a rowing race held annually on the River Thames in London, England, on the  Championship Course from Putney to Mortlake.

The race is between single scullers and is usually on the Saturday three to four weeks before the Scullers Head of the River Race which is the same race in reverse, attracts more international entries and is held in November every year.  Due to tide changes on the Tideway, the race may therefore be in October or in November.

History

The race was founded on 10 August 1830, at the instigation of barrister Henry Colsell Wingfield. The idea for the race was suggested at a dinner after a sculling race and following this a subscription dinner was held at the Swan in Battersea, where money was raised to fund the event, the rules were decided and a date was set.

The initial conditions were that the race should be run on the half tide from Westminster to Putney against all challengers, annually on 10 August forever (10 August being Wingfield's birthday), though the first race actually went from the Red House, Battersea to Hammersmith.

The Wingfield Sculls, the Diamond Challenge Sculls at Henley Royal Regatta and the London Cup in the Metropolitan Regatta made up the "Triple Crown" of the three premier men's amateur single sculling events in the United Kingdom.

Following the first Wingfield Sculls race, a separate Championship of the Thames for professional scullers was held for the first time in October 1831, which ceased in 1957 due to a decline in prize purses from betting in the sport and on the merger of the 'amateur' and 'professional'/'manual trade' former class-based categories of rowers.

Henry Wingfield

Henry Colsell Wingfield, born 1805, an Old Westminster, married Jane Nicholls in Margate, Kent in 1828. Henry Wingfield ("the First" of 3 Henrys) was the grandson of a rich hatter (felt hats), the son of an attorney and was raised at St James's Parish, Westminster.

He and Jane lived at 37 Great Marlborough Street near Oxford Circus — now rebuilt as a Coffee Republic and O'Neill's Irish Bar. They had two children. In 1842 Jane divorced Henry for adultery. Henry stayed long enough to bury his beloved daughter Emma 10 months later, in a new grand family grave at Kensal Green, Kensington and then emigrated to Prince Edward County — now part of Canada — which juts into Lake Ontario.

He farmed near Picton near South Marysburgh for 20 years, sometimes visiting England. In 1861, Henry Wingfield sold his farm and — wishing to spend his last days in England, embarked for Liverpool. At noon on 4 June 1861, 4 miles off the north point of Newfoundland in fog, his ship, the SS Canadian, struck an iceberg and the Wingfield Sculls founder and about 30 others of the passengers and crew of 300 succumbed to the cold and waves of the Atlantic Ocean.

Results

Women's race

The 2007 event on 25 October saw the revival of the women's championship which, except for the years between 1939 and 1948, had been an annual event from 1929 until the early 1970s, when the Women's Amateur Rowing Association amalgamated with the ARA.

The Wingfield Family Society have been involved with the Wingfield Sculls for the last 10 years (and a few years ago presented the Wingfield Sculls Committee with a new giant flag). It has also funded and presented a silver Trophy – based on Henry Wingfield's original 1830 Trophy – for the revived Women's Wingfields.

The closest living relative to Henry Wingfield, Clare Morton (the g-g-great granddaughter of Henry's Uncle John Wingfield) presented both the trophy to the winner of the 2007 race, Elise Laverick (Thames RC), and a framed montage of extracts about the "Life of the Wingfield Sculls Founder" to Wade Hall-Craggs, the Honorary Secretary of the Wingfield Sculls Committee.

Results

The last champion to win a hat trick on the Tideway was Margaret Gladden, she held the title from 1966 to 1971.

See also
Rowing on the River Thames

References

Bibliography
Cleaver, Hylton, A History of Rowing.
 British Amateur Rowing Association Almanacks, 1898–2007.

Mortlake, London
Rowing on the River Thames
Recurring events established in 1830
Water sports in London
1830 establishments in England